Almora is a municipal board and a cantonment town in the state of Uttarakhand, India. It is the administrative headquarters of Almora district. Almora is located on a ridge at the southern edge of the Kumaon Hills of the Himalaya range. The Koshi (Kaushiki) and Suyal (Salmale) rivers flow along the city and snow-capped Himalayas can be seen in the background.

Almora was founded in 1568. by King Kalyan Chand; however, there are accounts of human settlements in the hills and surrounding region in the Hindu epic Mahabharata (8th and 9th century BCE). Almora was the seat of Chand kings that ruled over the Kumaon Kingdom. It is considered the cultural heart of the Kumaon region of Uttarakhand.

According to the provisional results of the 2019 national census of India, Almora had a population of about 179,000. Nestled within higher peaks of the Himalaya, Almora enjoys a year-round mild temperate climate. The town is visited by thousands of tourists annually from all over the world. There are 11 blocks (i.e. VikashKhand) in Almora district.

Etymology
Almora got its name from Bhilmora, a kind of sorrel (although some have tried to derive it from Berberis "kilmora"), a short plant commonly found there which was used for washing the utensils of the sun temple at Katarmal. The people bringing the Bhilmora/kilmora were called Bhilmori/Kilmori and later "Almori" and the place came to be known as "Almora".

When king Bhishm Chand laid the foundation of the town, he had initially named it Alamnagar. Prior to that, Almora was known as 'Rajapur' during the early phase of Chand rule. The name 'Rajpur' is also mentioned over a number of ancient copper plates. There is still a place called Rajpur in Almora.

History
Almora was founded in 1568 by Kalyan Chand during the rule of the Chand dynasty. Prior to that the region was under the control of Katyuri King Bhaichaldeo who donated a part of Almora to Sri Chand Tiwari.

According to local tradition, the earliest inhabitants in Almora were Tewaris who were required to supply Sorrel daily for cleansing the vessels of the sun temple at Katarmal. Ancient lore mentioned in Vishnu Purana and Mahabharata present primordial accounts of human settlements in the city. The Sakas, the Nagas, the Kiratas, the Khasas and the Hunas are credited to be the most ancient tribes. The Kauravas and Pandavas of the Hastinapur royal family were the next important princes from the plains who are said to have affected the conquest of these parts. After the Mahabharata war the district seems to have remained for some time under the sway of the kings of Hastinapur whose authority was never more than nominal. The actual rulers were the local chiefs of whom the Kulindas (or Kunindas) were probably strong in the southern and western part of the city. The Khasas were another ancient people who belonged to an early Aryan stock and were widely scattered in those times. They gave this region the name Khasadesha or Khasamandala.

The next age was probably a period of many petty states rivalling each other for supremacy, which culminated in the inauguration of the noted and enduring dynasty of the Chands.  Earlier than this, the Katyuris are recorded as the dominant clans in copper and stone engravings. The Chand dynasty from their inception in 953 A.D. to their ouster in the late 18th century present a saga of strife, with a horrifying series of wars with the rulers of Garhwal culminating in the destruction of this prosperous land and establishment of inglorious Gurkha rule.  This dynasty was peculiar in that it made Almora the seat of strongest hill power in 1563 A.D. From that time onwards, the limits of the kingdom of Kumaon extended over the entire tracts of the districts of Almora and Nainital. Towards the end of the 17th century, the Chand Rajas again attacked the Garhwal kingdom, and in 1688, King Udyot Chand erected several temples at Almora, including Tripur Sundari, Udyot Chandeshwer and Parbateshwer, to mark his victory over Garhwal and Doti. The Parbateshwar temple was renamed twice, eventually becoming the present Nanda Devi temple.

In 1791, the Gorkhas of Nepal while expanding their kingdom westwards across the Kali River, invaded and overran Almora. In the meantime, the British were engaged in preventing the Gorkhas from over-running the whole of the northern frontier. The Gorkha rule lasted for twenty-four years. Due to their repeated intrusion into British territories in the Terai from 1800 onwards, Lord Moira, the Governor-General of India, decided to attack Almora in December 1814, marking the beginning of the Anglo-Gorkha war. The war that broke out in 1814 resulted in the defeat of the Gorkhas and subsequently led to the signing of the Treaty of Sugauli in 1816. According to the treaty, Nepal had to cede all those territories which the Gorkhas had annexed to the British East India Company. After the war, the old Lal Mandi fort, near Almora was renamed ‘Fort Moira’.

Unlike neighbouring hill stations such as Nainital and Shimla, which were developed by the British, Almora was developed long before by the Chand kings. The place where the present cantonment is located was formerly known as Lalmandi. Presently where the collectorate exists, the 'Malla Mahal' (Upper Court) of the Chand kings was located. The site of the present District Hospital used to be 'Talla Mahal' (Lower Court) of the Chand rulers. Almora had a population of 8,596 in 1901.

Geography

Location

It is situated 365 km north-east the national capital New Delhi and 415 km south-east of the state capital Dehradun. It lies in the revenue Division Kumaon and is located 63 km north of Nainital, the administrative headquarters of Kumaon.

Almora is situated on a ridge at the southern edge of the Kumaon Hills of the Central Himalaya range in the shape of a horse saddle shaped hillock. The eastern portion of the ridge is known as Talifat and the western one is known as Selifat. The Almora Market is situated at the top of the ridge, where these two, Talifat and Selifat jointly terminate. It is surrounded by thick forests of pine, deodar and fir trees. Flowing alongside the city are the Koshi (Kaushiki) and Suyal (Salmale) rivers. The snow-capped Himalayas can be seen in the background.

Climate

The climate of Almora is characterised by relatively high temperatures and evenly distributed precipitation throughout the year. The main seasons are summer from March to June, the monsoon season from July to October and winter from November to February. In summer, Almora is largely under the influence of moist, maritime airflow from the western side of the subtropical anticyclonic cells over low-latitude ocean waters. Temperatures are high and can lead to warm, oppressive nights. Summers are usually somewhat wetter than winters, with much of the rainfall coming from convectional thunderstorm activity; tropical cyclones also enhance warm-season rainfall in some regions. The coldest month is usually quite mild, although frosts are not uncommon, and winter precipitation is derived primarily from frontal cyclones along the polar front. The Köppen climate classification subtype for this climate is Cwa (Humid Subtropical Climate).

This information is as per the Abaal Institute. There are an average of 46.8 days of precipitation, with the most precipitation occurring in August with 11.9 days and the least precipitation occurring in November with 0.6 days.

Flora and fauna

The region is immensely rich with 4000 species of plants, having remarkable diversity in its natural vegetation by virtue of its having a great range of elevation. Climatic variations, particularly in temperature and precipitation associated with the alignment and elevation of its ranges and valleys, determine the altitudinal growth and variety of vegetation. The flora of this region may be classified into tropical, Himalayan sub-tropical and subalpine and alpine vegetation. The alpine and sub-alpine zones are considered as the most natural abode of the largest number of medicinal plants.

The sub-alpine zones of Almora and outskirts are a natural sanctuary for leopard, Langur, Himalayan black bear, kakar, goral, etc. Whereas the high altitude zones abound musk deer, popularly called "Kastura Mrig", snow leopard, blue sheep, thar, etc. The entire zone is rich in a remarkable variety of birds possessing plumage of magnificent design and colours like the peacock, and which also includes the grey quail, black francolin/kala titar, whistling thrush, chakor, monal, cheer pheasant, kokla, and Kalij pheasant.

Demographics

, Almora has a population of 35,513 of which 18,306 are males, while 17,207 are females. Out of the total population, The Almora Municipal Board has a population of 34,122, while The Almora Cantonment Board has a population of 1,391. The population of children in the age range of 0-6 years is 3,081, which is 8.67% of the total population of Almora. The literacy rate of Almora city is 86.19%, higher than the state average of 78.82%. Male literacy is around 88.06%, while the female literacy rate is 84.21%. Almora had a population of 32,358 according to the 2001 Census of India.

The earliest known reference to the population of Almora occurs in the book 'The Kingdom of Nepal' by Francis Hamilton. During his visit to Fatehgarh, Hamilton was told by Pt. Hariballav Pande that there were around a thousand houses in Almora during the Gorkha rule. Mr. G.W. Traill, the second commissioner of the Kumaon division, has written that there were 742 houses in Almora in 1821, in which 1,369 men, 1,178 women, and 968 children lived, and thus the total population of the town was 3,505.

Hinduism is practised by 90.84% of the total population and is the majority religion of Almora. Islam is practiced by 7.54% of people and is the largest minority religion. Other religions like Sikhism, Christianity and Buddhism are also practiced by a small number of people. Hindi and Sanskrit are the official languages of the state while Kumaoni is the mother tongue of the majority.

The Municipal board (Nagar Palika Parishad) of Almora was established in 1864. The Almora Nagar Palika Parishad has a population of 34,122 of which 17,358 are males while 16,764 are females as per the report released by Census India 2011. The population of children within the age range of 0-6 is 2950 which is 8.65% of the total population of Almora (NPP). In Almora Nagar Palika Parishad, the female sex ratio is of 966 against the state average of 963.  Moreover, the child sex ratio in Almora is around 857 compared to Uttarakhand's state average of 890.  Literacy rate of Almora city is 94.51% higher than state average of 78.82%.  In Almora, Male literacy is around 96.84% while female literacy rate is 92.13%.  Schedule Caste (SC) constitutes 16.38% while Schedule Tribe (ST) were 1.00% of total population in Almora (NPP).  Out of total population, 10,057 were engaged in work or business activity. Of this 7,901 were males while 2,156 were females.  Of the total 10,057 working population, 93.25% were engaged in main work while 6.75% of total workers were engaged in marginal work. Almora Nagar Palika Parishad has total administration over 8,014 houses to which it supplies basic amenities like water and sewerage. Almora is divided into 11 wards for which elections are held every 5 years.

Culture

Temples

Almora has many notable temples, including Kasar Devi, Nanda Devi, Doli Daana, Shyayi Devi, Khakmara, Asht Bhairav, Jakhandevi, Katarmal (Sun Temple), Pataal Devi, Raghunath Mandir, Badreshwar, Banari Devi, Chitai, Jageshwar, Binsar Mahadev, Garhnath and Baijnath.

Kasar Devi temple constructed in 2nd century CE, was visited by Swami Vivekananda and this area has a Chabad House. It's believed that this temple is positioned on the earth’s Van Allen Belt. The region surrounding the Kasar Devi Temple has an enormous geomagnetic field, thanks to gaps in bands of radiation. As a result, Kasar Devi is endowed with a cosmic energy similar to that of Stonehenge in UK and Machu Pichu in Peru.

Rudreshwar Mahadev Temple, near Sanara Ganiya, is dedicated to Lord Shiva. It is beside the river Ram Ganga. A sun temple (only the second in the world) is at Katarmal, a short distance from the town. The temple of Manila Devi, Devi Maa, the family goddess of the Katyuri clan, lies around 85 km from Ranikhet. Udaipur a temple of Golu devta is 5 km from Binta near Dwarahat.

Dunagiri has the highly revered temple of Shakti or Mother Goddess. Dunagiri is known as the birthplace of modern-day Kriya Yoga. There is a notable temple in Almora district which is in the village of Chaura near Bhaisor Gaun, Someshwar. This temple is dedicated to Lord Golu who is considered as a lord of justice in Uttarakhand. This temple is about 40 km from Almora town. Another temple of Almora district is Airdau which is in Someshwar. Someshwar is a tehsil in the Almora district, which is very rich in agricultural ways.

Pandu Kholi is another ancient temple in the Almora district. According to Hindu mythology, Pandavas spent some time here to escape from Duryodhana. The distance of this temple from Almora is about 80  km. Another very ancient and holy Shiva temple in Someshwar town is known as Khakeshwar Mahadev temple. It is in Bhaisor Gaun village, on the bank of a river.

Transport

Road 

Well connected by motorable roads with major destinations of Uttarakhand state and northern India. Uttarakhand Transport Corporation runs Buses from Almora bus station to major north Indian cities such as Delhi, Dehradun, Lucknow, Chandigarh etc. Taxis and Private Buses, mostly run by K.M.O.U, connect Almora to other major destinations of the Kumaon region. Government of Uttarakhand is constructing an ISBT near Lower Mall Road, which will be helpful for establishing a large tourist network in the city and to destinations in the surrounding Kumaon region. It will be the second ISBT of Uttarakhand after Dehradun. A Sub Regional Transport Office is located in Almora where Vehicles are registered by the number UK-01.

Train 
Kathgodam railway station is the nearest railway station. Kathgodam is the last terminus of the broad gauge line of North East Railways that connects Kumaon with Delhi, Dehradun and Howrah.

Air 
Pantnagar Airport, located in Pantnagar is the primary Airport serving the entire Kumaon Region. Bareilly Airport is another domestic airport which also serves the Kumaon region. Indira Gandhi International Airport, located in Delhi is the nearest International Airport.

Education

Almora has three universities, Kumaun University, Soban Singh Jeena University and Uttarakhand Residential University.
Almora has a total of 23 Primary Schools, 7 Middle Schools, 2 Secondary Schools, and 9 Senior Secondary Schools.

List of schools

 KOORMANCHAL ACADEMY
 Holy Angel Public School
 Army Public School
 The Pleasant Valley School, Highland Korichina
 NBU International School
 Kendriya Vidyalaya Almora
 K D Memorial Public School
 Vivekanand Girls Inter College
 Vivekanand Inter College
 Adam's Girls Inter College
 New Modern Public School
 New Inspiration School
 Maharishi Vidya Mandir
 Beersheba Sr. Secondary Public School
 Sharda Public School
 Almora Inter College

 Ramsay's Inter College
 Raja Anand Singh Govt. Girls Inter College
 Govt. Inter College ( G.I.C Almora)
 Aarya Kanya Inter College
 St. Paul public school
 Grace Public School
 Green Field Public School
 Spring Dales public school
 Saraswati Shishu Mandir Narsingh Badi, Shivaji Nagar, Jeewan Dham
 Lawrence Primary School
 Mangal Deep Vidya Mandir
 Govt. Inter College Raingal
 Blooming birds public school

Institutions

Soban Singh Jeena University Mall road 
Kumaun University Soban Singh Jeena Campus
Soban Singh Jeena Government Institute of Medical Sciences & Research (Under Development)
G.B. Pant National Institute of Himalayan Environment and Sustainable Development, Ranikhet road
ICAR Vivekanand Institute of Hill Agriculture and Research, Mall road
Government Institute of Hotel Management & Catering Technology Nainital road
Govt. Girls Polytechnic College Patal Devi
NRDMS Kumaun University 
CEMS Almora

Pandit Udit Uday Shankar Natya Academy
Uttarakhand Residential University Almora

Kumaon engineering college

Media and communications
All India Radio has a local station in Almora which transmits programs of mass interest. Almora station of A.I.R. was founded in June 1986 and is a primary channel station running on medium wave catering the whole of Kumaon division. The main service providers are Dish TV and Doordarshan. BSNL, Vodafone and Airtel have the three largest cellular networks in the city. There are Internet cafés in and around the city, but broadband connectivity is limited. Satellite dishes exist in most homes in the region and the channels available throughout India are also available here.

Multiple local Hindi and English newspapers are published, whereas regional and national Hindi and English newspapers, printed elsewhere in India, are also circulated in Almora. a number of historical newspapers and magazines have been published from Almora like Prabuddha Bharata, Almora Akhbar, Shakti and Swadhin Praja etc.

In 1871 A.D. Pt. Buddhiballav Pant opened a debating club. When Sir William Muir, the then provincial Governor, came here he was highly pleased with the working of this club. It is said that he also advised to open a press here and publish a newspaper. Mr. Pant, as advised, opened a press here and started publishing a weekly magazine Almora Akhbar. Almora Akhbar was the oldest Hindi weekly of this province. In 1913 A.D. Badri Datt Pandey took over the editing work of the magazine. Almora Akhbar made much progress; The number of its customers rose from 50–60 to 1500; however, it was closed in 1917. In 1918 one of the partners purchased the Debating Club Press and named it Vindhyavasini Press. From 1922 A.D. a weekly named Zila Samachar began to be published. Later on it came to be called Kumaun Kumud and was still being published until the late 1930s.

In 1893–1894, Babu Devidas opened Kumaun Printing Press which published a weekly named Kurmanchal Samachar. Another weekly named Kurmanchal Mitra was also published but it was stopped after sometime. The Prabuddha Bharata started publication in August 1898 from Almora, and was edited by Swami Swarupananda. In 1918 A.D. Badri Datt Pandey with the help of his friends opened a press named Deshbhakta and started publishing a magazine Shakti from it. Being displeased at the policy of Shakti, some of his partners filed suits and withdrew their shares and in 1919 A.D. opened Sombari Press from which for some time a magazine named 'Jyoti' was published. Later on this press also was sold and the publication was stopped. Shakti continued published till 1942, when owing to policies of the government, its publication was stopped. The publication resumed again in 1946 with the efforts of Pandit Gobind Ballabh Pant.

In 1930 A.D., a paper named Swadhin Praja was published. Its director was patriot Victor Mohan Joshi. In 1934 A.D. a weekly named Samta was published. Directed by an artisan, Hari Prasad Tamta, it received a monthly help of Rs. 2001- from the government. Formerly it was printed in Indra Printing Press but later the publication shifted to Krishna Press in Haldwani. Since 1935 A.D. an illustrated monthly magazine named Natkhat is being published from Indra Printing Press.

Notable people

Rabindranath Tagore spent time in Almora and purchased a house in nearby Ramgarh where he stayed during the First World War.
Swami Vivekananda visited Almora thrice during his Himalayan sojourns. He expressed great eagerness in making an Ashrama in the bosom of Himalayas for the practice of pure Advaita Vedanta.
Jawaharlal Nehru was in the Almora jail for a short time during the freedom struggle.
Govind Ballabh Pant (10 September 1887 – 7 March 1961), noted freedom fighter, first chief minister of Uttar Pradesh and later Home Minister of India, was born in Almora.
Uday Shankar's dance school was established at Almora in the late 1930s. Ravi Shankar, BabaAlauddin Khan, Ali Akbar Khan, Annapurna Devi, Amala Shankar et al. were some of the celebrities among people who became famous later and learnt to dance and act here like Guru Dutt, Zohra Sehgal.
Sumitranandan Pant, (20 May 1900 – 28 December 1977) a modern Hindi poet, was born at Kausani village of Bageshwar, in the hills of Kumaon.
Bhairab Dutt Pande, former cabinet secretary of India and governor of West Bengal, Punjab was a resident of Almora.
Sir Ronald Ross, winner in 1902 of Nobel Prize for Physiology or Medicine for his path-breaking discovery in malaria parasite, was born here in 1857.
Manohar Shyam Joshi the eminent Hindi writer and Indian TV's soap opera pioneer was from an Almora family of Galli village.
Swami Satyananda Saraswati of the Bihar School of Yoga and Rikhiapeeth was born in Almora on 25 December 1923 in Zamindari Family of Bhikiyasen and Gaja.
Anagarika Govinda a leading authority on Tibetan Buddhism lived in Almora for a long time, along with his partner Li Gotami.
 Alfred Sorensen, John Blofeld, Beat Poets Allen Ginsberg, Peter Orlovsky and Gary Snyder - the original Dharma Bums, the LSD Gurus Timothy Leary and Ralph Metzner, the psychiatrist R. D. Laing, and Tibetologist Robert Thurman were among the many celebrities who lived or stayed in Almora.
Walter Evans-Wentz, Anthropologist and pioneer of Tibetan Buddhism studies lived in Almora. 
American actress Uma Thurman spent a small part of her childhood at Crank's Ridge, near Almora, with her father Robert Thurman.
Begum Ra'ana Liaquat Ali Khan (née Sheila Irene Pant) (1905 - 13 June 1990) was born in a Kumauni Hindu-turned-Christian family at Almora. She was the wife of Pakistan's first prime minister Liaquat Ali Khan.
 ComradeP.C. Joshi, the first chairman of the Communist Party of India (CPI), was born in Almora. 
Murli Manohar Joshi, the Union Human Resources Development minister of India (born 5 January 1934) in the NDA government.
B.C. Joshi, General Bhuwan Chandra Joshi, PVSM, AVSM, ADC (1935 - 19 November 1994) was the Chief of Army Staff (CoAS) of the Indian Army, belongs to Almora district (Talladaniya).
Devendra Kumar Joshi former chief of Naval Staff, Admiral D. K. Joshi, PVSM, AVSM, ADC, YSM (born: 4 July 1954) in Almora
Shivani, Hindi writer was from Almora
Munshi Hari Pradasd Tamta was the first industrialist of the Kumaon region. He was a social activist. He is remembered for his work of uplifting the downtrodden and the society. He was also an MLA from the Gonda constituency and Chairman of Almora municipal corporation. His life-size statue is kept in the Lt Col Joshi at Chaudhan Pata Almora to give him respect and honour.
Prasoon Joshi, writer poet-lyricist Adguru
Singer-musician Mohan Upreti, and many other artistic gems have roots in Almora.
Roop Durgapal, Television actress, popularly known for her roles in TV shows like Balika Vadhu, Swaragini, Gangaa & several others was born & brought up in Almora.
Ekta Bisht is an Indian women's cricket player. She is a left-handed batswoman and slow left-arm orthodox bowler. She is the first International woman cricketer from Uttarakhand.
 Baba Hari Dass (Hari Datt Karnatak, also known as Haridas Baba, born in Almora, 26 March 1923), a silent master yogi, founder of several teaching projects in US, Canada, and India, builder of temples and the author of scriptural commentaries.
 Nilamber Pant, former vice chairman of ISRO and a Padma Shri winner.
Lalit Pande, a social worker, environmentalist and the founder of Uttarakhand Seva Nidhi Environmental Education Centre. The Government of India awarded him with Padma Shri, in 2007.
Sunil Kr. Tiwari, Actor from the town, worked in films: Fire in the Mountain, Samosa And Sons.
Lakshya Sen, India's highest ranked men's singles badminton player [as of 6-Apr-22], who has won several medals including at World Championship, All England Open, and Youth Olympics.

Further reading

References

External links

 Official Website of Almora district

 
Tourism in Uttarakhand
Hill stations in Uttarakhand
Cantonments of India
Cantonments of British India
Cities and towns in Almora district
1568 establishments in India
Populated places established in 1568